Buddy is a BBC schools drama, based on the novel of the same name by Nigel Hinton. It was shown as part of the social studies strand.

It starred Wayne Goddard as Buddy Clark, a teenager dealing with various life problems, Roger Daltrey as his father Terry and pupils from the Cavendish School in Eastbourne.

Daltrey reprised his role in the 1991 film Buddy's Song with Chesney Hawkes as Buddy.

Episodes
 "Raining in My Heart"
 "Crying, Waiting, Hoping"
 "Blue Suede Shoes"
 "That'll Be the Day"
 "Everyday It's-A Getting Closer"

Differences from the novel
When Buddy is first seen in school his friends Julius and Charmian are present. In the book they were off with the cold.

When Terry was arrested along with Ralph, Des King turned up then walked away. In the book he does not turn up at that moment.

When Buddy ran away he went straight to 56 Croxley Street. In the book he spent the first night in a bus shelter out in the countryside.

Cast

External links

BBC children's television shows
British television shows based on children's books
1986 British television series debuts
1986 British television series endings
1980s British children's television series
Television series about teenagers